Guillaume Cassuto is a French director, writer, and visual effects artist based in London, England. He is best known for being the creator and former showrunner of the Cartoon Network animated series Elliott from Earth. He is also known for his work on The Amazing World of Gumball as a compositing supervisor and writer.

Career
After graduating from Supinfocom, Guillaume Cassuto began his career working on commercials, short films, television shows, and music videos. He was a lighting and rendering artist for Picasso Pictures, alighting, rendering, and compositing technical director for Superfad, The Mill, and Passion Pictures, and a VFX and rendering artist for Nexus Studios. From 2011 to 2017, he worked as a background artist, compositing supervisor, and writer for the Cartoon Network series The Amazing World of Gumball. Cassuto then left the show on October 27, 2017, and created the Cartoon Network animated series Elliott from Earth. But as of the end of October 2019, Cassuto, due to a "mutual parting of ways" with Cartoon Network, left production and stepped down as showrunner. Cassuto is currently based in London, England. As of 2021, he is currently directing animation projects and music videos.

Filmography

Short films

Television

Music Videos

Video Games

References

External links

Living people
British animated film directors
British screenwriters
British television directors
Cartoon Network Studios people
English animators
French animators
French animated film directors
French emigrants to England
French screenwriters
French television directors
Year of birth missing (living people)